Schilleriella may refer to:
 Schilleriella (wasp), a genus of wasps in the family Encyrtidae
 Schilleriella (alga), a genus of algae in the family Pleurochloridaceae